Willis Brewer (1844–1912) was a United States representative from Alabama, holding office from 1897 to 1901.  Before that, he held multiple terms of office in both the Alabama State Senate and the Alabama House of Representatives.  He also held other public offices including State Auditor of Alabama and treasurer of Lowndes County, Alabama.  He was trained as an attorney and practiced law in the state, was a newspaper editor in both Alabama and Florida, and has written books about the history of Alabama.

Early life and education
Brewer was born on March 15, 1844, near the town of Livingston in Sumter County, Alabama, to Robert Willis and Jane (Hadden) Brewer.  
He attended the common schools and, at the age of fourteen, entered a local printing business.  At seventeen, he and a schoolmate, William R. DeLoach, who later became Judge of the probate court in Sumter County, established a newspaper in Milton, Florida.

Military career
During the latter part of the U.S. Civil War, while still engaged in the newspaper business in Florida, Brewer entered the Confederate States Army.  Because of health issues, he was unable to serve in the fighting, but served post duty and during the latter part of the war was a staffmember for Brigadier General Wirt Adams.

After the war, Brewer studied law and was admitted to the bar in 1870.  He then began a practice in Hayneville, Alabama.

Public service

Brewer was appointed Treasurer of Lowndes County, Alabama, in 1871 by Governor Robert B. Lindsay.  He was elected
as State Auditor of Alabama, where he served from 1876 to 1880.  He served as member of the Alabama House of Representatives from 1880 to 1882 and again from 1890 to 1894.  He served in the Alabama State Senate from 1882 to 1890 and again from 1894 to 1897.

Brewer was elected as a Democrat to the Fifty-fifth and Fifty-sixth Congress (March 4, 1897, to March 3, 1901). In April 1898, Brewer was among the six representatives who voted against declaring war on Spain. After an unsuccessful bid for renomination in 1900, he resumed the practice of law and continued his work as an author.

Brewer died in Montgomery, Alabama, on October 30, 1912, and was interred in the family mausoleum on Cedars Plantation near Montgomery.

References

1844 births
1912 deaths
People from Livingston, Alabama
American planters
Democratic Party members of the United States House of Representatives from Alabama
19th-century American politicians